Imperobator ("powerful warrior") is a genus of paravian theropod that lived during the Maastrichtian stage of the Late Cretaceous period in what is now Antarctica. It contains a single species, I. antarcticus, recovered from the Snow Hill Island Formation. Before its description, it was informally nicknamed the "Naze dromaeosaur", despite the lack of a "sickle claw" characteristic of the group. In 2019, the describing authors suggested that Imperobator was about the same size as Utahraptor.

Discovery and naming
The only described species is known from a single specimen, UCMP 276000, which was first uncovered in 2003 at the early Maastrichtian-aged Cape Lamb Member of the Snow Hill Island Formation on James Ross Island, Antarctica. The Cape Lamb Member has been dated to the early Maastrichtian, about 71 million years ago. UCMP 276000 consists of an incomplete isolated left pes including a portion of the tibia, an incomplete astragalus, a partial calcaneus and fibula, as well as an ungual, partial phalanges and metacarpals. The specimen was formally described as the holotype of a new genus and species, Imperobator antarcticus, by Ely and Case in 2019. The generic name derives from the Latin for “powerful warrior“. The specific name refers to the continent in which the specimen was discovered.

Before Imperobator was officially described, a paper published in 2007 announced the specimen and assigned it to the clade Dromaeosauridae; as such it was nicknamed the "Naze dromaeosaur". This was problematic as UCMP 276000 lacked multiple characteristics of dromaeosaurids, including a prominent sickle claw, and as such the paper naming and describing Imperobator assigned it only to the clade Paraves.

Description
The holotype measures approximately 45 cm in length. From this, an estimated length of 3-4 meters for the animal has been obtained using measurements from related species such as Utahraptor. This shows that Imperobator exhibited gigantism, a trait not often seen among pariavians and is best documented in genera such as Utahraptor, Austroraptor, Deinonychus and Dakotaraptor. Despite prior assignment to Dromaeosauridae, Imperobator has since been assigned to the clade Paraves due to certain characteristics that differ from those of dromaeosaurids, including the lack of a sickle claw, the smooth surface of the distal metatarsal II and the lack of an ungual of the second pedal digit.

Based on evidence from other paravians, Imperobator most likely had a sort of feathery covering on most of its body. It would be also safe to assume that Imperobator was carnivorous, however, whether it scavenged or hunted its prey at this stage is unclear.

Classification
When first reported in 2007, Imperobator was largely regarded as a dromaeosaurid dinosaur, mainly because of the purpoted pedal similarities with members of this group. During the formal description of Imperobator, the authors recovered this taxon as a paravian theropod, related to smaller members of the group. Later in 2019 Scott Hartman and team in their description of Hesperornithoides conducted a large phylogenetic analysis of Theropoda, where they recovered Imperobator (left unnamed at the time the analysis was created) as a basal (primitive) ornithomimosaur closely allied to deinocheirid ornithomimosaurs; however, an updated version of that analysis made by one of the authors (including information from its formal description) recovered it as a basal member of the Deinonychosauria.

Paleoecology
During the time in which Imperobator lived, Earth's climate was much warmer and humid than it is today and as a result Antarctica was without ice. The environment was mainly dominated by large dense conifer forests, cycads and gingkos. Despite the warmer climate, the animals inhabiting Antarctica at this time would have to endure long periods of darkness during the winter, much like what happens in modern-day Antarctica.

Currently a plethora of other extinct organisms from the Snow Hill Island Formation have been discovered, which are likely to have interacted with Imperobator during the Late Cretaceous period. This includes the ornithopods Trinisaura santamartaensis and Morrosaurus antarcticus, the Parankylosaur Antarctopelta oliveroi, the shark Notidanodon sp. as well as some intermediate elasmosaurids, titanosaurs and a pterosaur.

References 

Prehistoric paravians
Maastrichtian life
Cretaceous Antarctica
Dinosaurs of Antarctica
Fossil taxa described in 2019